Aeka may refer to:

Aeka language
Aeka Masaki Jurai, a character in the anime series Tenchi Muyo!